Bullough's Pond, a former mill pond located in Newton, Massachusetts, is now a decorative pond in a suburban neighborhood, used for bird watching and walking.  In the nineteenth century it was the site of a commercial ice business.  Since the early 2000s, temperatures have warmed to the point that its winter ice is no longer thick enough to support skating safely.

Books 

Once Around Bullough's Pond: A Native American Epic, Douglas Worth, 1987
Reflections in Bullough's Pond: Economy and Ecosystem in New England, Diana Muir, University Press of New England, 2000. Winner of the Massachusetts Book Award, 2001

Films 
A scene from "The Women," starring Annette Bening and Meg Ryan, was filmed on the pond.

Notable residents 
Alex Beam
Diana Muir

Image gallery

References

External links
Bullough's Pond Association
Newton Conservators
City of Newton
Photos by Ellen Foust

Geography of Newton, Massachusetts
Lakes of Middlesex County, Massachusetts
Ponds of Massachusetts